Abrus canescens is a species of flowering plant belonging to the legume family, native to Africa. It is considered almost extinct.

Description
The plant's stem is brown and its leaves are a rusty brown to silvery colour with trichomes on the top and bottom. Both the stem and leaves are described as "very pubescent". It has between 7-13 pairs of leaflets measuring from  0.60 – 2.30 cm in length and 0.30 – 0.90 cm in breadth. The leaflets are a narrow oblong shape with all but the last pair having a smooth, round apex and an obtuse to round base. The flowers are purple. The fruit consists of between 1 and 6 flat, straight, brown pods measuring  3.20 - 6.00 cm in length and 0.40 - 1.40 cm in breadth. The seeds are smooth, flat and black in colour.

References

External links

Faboideae
Flora of Africa